Zoica parvula, is a species of spider of the genus Zoica. It is native to Myanmar, Malaysia, Sri Lanka and Thailand.

See also
 List of Lycosidae species

References

Lycosidae
Arthropods of Malaysia
Spiders of Asia
Spiders described in 1895